Rosebud is an unincorporated community in Stokes County, North Carolina, United States, approximately two miles west-northwest of Walnut Cove.

Unincorporated communities in Stokes County, North Carolina
Unincorporated communities in North Carolina